Welke is a surname. Notable people with the surname include:

Bill Welke (born 1967), American baseball umpire
Chuck Welke (1953-2021), American educator and politician
Oliver Welke (born 1966), German television presenter and comedian
Tim Welke (born 1957), American baseball umpire

See also 
Welke Airport, Michigan, United States

Surnames from nicknames